Bobby Baldwin (born c. 1950) is a professional poker player and casino executive.  As a poker player, Baldwin is best known as the winner of the 1978 World Series of Poker Main Event, becoming the youngest Main Event champion at that time.

Baldwin was born in Tulsa, Oklahoma, and attended Oklahoma State University in 1970. He currently resides in Las Vegas.

Poker career
Baldwin won his first two bracelets at the 1977 World Series of Poker, first winning the $10,000 Deuce to Seven Draw event, then winning the $5,000 Seven Card Stud event.

Baldwin won his largest tournament prize in 1978 when he won the WSOP Main Event, earning the title and the $210,000 first prize. He defeated a final table that included professional poker players Ken Smith, Jesse Alto, Buck Buchanan, WSOP bracelet winner Louis Hunsucker, and businessman Crandell Addington, whom Baldwin defeated in heads-up play.

When Baldwin won the 1978 World Series of Poker Main Event at age 28, he became the youngest winner in its history. His title of youngest winner was later superseded by Stu Ungar in 1980.

In 1979, he won the $10,000 Deuce to Seven Draw event again, earning his fourth and most recent bracelet at the WSOP. Baldwin also competed in the Super Bowl of Poker tournaments, organized by 1972 world champion Amarillo Slim. Baldwin cashed in several SBOP events and won the $5,000 Seven Card Stud event in 1979.

His major wins include four WSOP bracelets, all won from 1977 to 1979. He won WSOP bracelets in three consecutive years (1977, 1978, and 1979) which only a small number of players have done in the history of the WSOP.  In addition to his 1978 victory, Baldwin's other WSOP Main Event cashes are: 1981 (7th), 1986 (16th), 1987 (21st), 1991 (29th), 1992 (15th), 1994 (24th), and 2009 (352nd).

In 2003, Baldwin was inducted into the Poker Hall of Fame.

His last live cash came in the 2012 World Series of Poker in the Big One for One Drop.

Career as casino executive 
In 1982, he became a consultant for the Golden Nugget casino, and in 1984 was named the president.  He was selected to head The Mirage in 1987, and was named as the president of the Bellagio hotel and casino in 1998.

In 1999–2000, he was the chief financial officer of Mirage Resorts under Steve Wynn; in 2000, upon the merger of Mirage Resorts and MGM Grand, he became the chief executive officer of the Mirage Resorts subsidiary of MGM Mirage.

In 2005, after the acquisition of Mandalay Resort Group by MGM Mirage, Baldwin became CEO and President of the announced Project City Center, while continuing his responsibilities as CEO of the Mirage Resorts subsidiary. Baldwin now oversees additional resorts added through the Mandalay Resort Group buyout as well as the previous Wynn properties.

In 2018, following a lengthy tenure as Chief Customer Development Officer of MGM Resorts and CEO and President of CityCenter, MGM announced that Baldwin would leave both positions by the end of 2018.

Other interests 
In addition to poker, Baldwin is also known as a world class billiards player. Baldwin and his playing style are the subject of a book entitled Bobby Baldwin's Winning Poker Secrets, which was written by Mike Caro. Baldwin has written many columns on poker and he authored a section for Doyle Brunson's Super/System.  His own book Tales Out of Tulsa, a poker guide for novices, was published in 1985.

The high-stakes signature poker room in the Bellagio is named "Bobby's Room" after Baldwin.

As of 2012, his total live tournament winnings exceed $2,300,000. His 20 cashes at the WSOP account for $2,100,311 of those winnings.

World Series of Poker bracelets

Notes

1950s births
American poker players
American casino industry businesspeople
Living people
People from the Las Vegas Valley
Businesspeople from Tulsa, Oklahoma
Super Bowl of Poker event winners
World Series of Poker bracelet winners
World Series of Poker Main Event winners
Date of birth missing (living people)
Place of birth missing (living people)
Poker Hall of Fame inductees